Car surfing involves riding on the outside of a moving vehicle being driven by another person. It has resulted in numerous deaths, predominantly causing severe head injuries.

The Quebec Provincial Automobile Insurance Company defines car surfing as follows:
 Riding on a moving vehicle (on the roof, at the rear, on the side, etc.);
 Riding in the box or cargo space of a truck or pick-up truck;
 Holding onto or being pulled by a moving vehicle;
 Riding in a sofa, on a skateboard, a sled or any other object hitched or tied to a moving vehicle.

History
Car surfing, a term introduced in the mid-1980s, involves riding on the outside of a moving vehicle being driven by another person. It has been popularized by the hyphy movement seen in the fad of ghost-riding, except the vehicle remains under the nominal control of another person.

Risks
A 2008 study by the United States Centers for Disease Control identified 58 newspaper reports of car-surfing deaths and 41 reports of nonfatal injury from 1990 through summer 2008. Most reports of injury were found in U.S. Midwest and Southern newspapers (75%), largely involving males (70%) and youths aged 15–19 (69%). A majority (58%) of reported car surfing incidents ended in death.

See also

 Elevator surfing
 Ghost riding
 List of train surfing injuries and deaths
 Skitching
 Train surfing

References

External links
  The origins and risks of car surfing (Naval Safety Center)
 GTA blamed for Increase in car surfing deaths

Hazardous motor vehicle activities
1980s fads and trends